Jim Stevenson may refer to:

Jim Stevenson (footballer, born 1935) (1935–2009), Scottish footballer for Dundee
Jim Stevenson (footballer, born 1881) (1881–1946), footballer for Nottingham Forest and Gillingham
Jim Stevenson (footballer, born 1992), English football midfielder
Jim Stevenson (politician), municipal politician in Calgary, Alberta
Jim Stevenson (psychologist) (born 1947), British psychologist
Jim Stevenson (rugby union), Scottish former rugby union player
Jim Stevenson (decathlete), British athlete at the athletics at the 1993 Summer Universiade – Men's decathlon

See also
James Stevenson (disambiguation)